Afrixalus, commonly known as the banana frogs, spiny reed frogs,  cat's eye reed frogs, or leaf-folding frogs, is a genus of frog in the family Hyperoliidae. They occur in the Subsaharan Africa. They lay their eggs in vegetation above water, often folding leaves around the eggs for protection—hence the common name "leaf-folding frogs".

Species
The following species are recognised in the genus Afrixalus :

The AmphibiaWeb lists 31 species. It does not include Afrixalus "quadrivittatus", and does not recognize Afrixalus brachycnemis as a full species.

References

 
Hyperoliidae
Amphibian genera
Amphibians of Sub-Saharan Africa
Taxa named by Raymond Laurent
Taxonomy articles created by Polbot